Heterocerus is a genus of beetles in the family Heteroceridae. There are at least 20 described species in Heterocerus.

Species
 Heterocerus angustatus Chevrolat, 1864
 Heterocerus aptus Miller, 1994
 Heterocerus brunneus Melsheimer, 1844
 Heterocerus cinctus Motschulsky, 1858
 Heterocerus coheni Skalický, 2007
 Heterocerus collaris Kiesenwetter, 1851
 Heterocerus crossi Miller, 1995
 Heterocerus fenestratus (Thunberg, 1784)
 Heterocerus inciertus (Pacheco, 1964)
 Heterocerus infrequens Miller, 1994
 Heterocerus insolens Miller, 1994
 Heterocerus intermuralis Pacheco, 1963
 Heterocerus mexicanus Sharp, 1882
 Heterocerus mirus Miller, 1994
 Heterocerus mollinus Kiesenwetter, 1851
 Heterocerus pallidus Say, 1823
 Heterocerus parrotus (Pacheco, 1964)
 Heterocerus subtilis Miller, 1988
 Heterocerus tenuis Miller, 1988
 Heterocerus texanus (Pacheco, 1964)
 Heterocerus undatus Melsheimer, 1844
 Heterocerus unicus Miller, 1988
 Heterocerus unituberculosus Miller, 1995
 Heterocerus virginiensis Skalický, 2007

References

 Pacheco, Francisco (1978). "Family: Heteroceridae". A Catalog of the Coleoptera of America North of Mexico, x + 8.

Further reading

 Arnett, R. H. Jr., M. C. Thomas, P. E. Skelley and J. H. Frank. (eds.). (21 June 2002). American Beetles, Volume II: Polyphaga: Scarabaeoidea through Curculionoidea. CRC Press LLC, Boca Raton, Florida .
 Arnett, Ross H. (2000). American Insects: A Handbook of the Insects of America North of Mexico. CRC Press.
 Richard E. White. (1983). Peterson Field Guides: Beetles. Houghton Mifflin Company.

External links

 NCBI Taxonomy Browser, Heterocerus

Byrrhoidea